Vozrozhdenie Bank is a Russian bank founded in  1991 and headquartered in Moscow. It provides personal banking and business services to clients in Russia.

References 

Banks established in 1991
Banks of Russia
Companies listed on the Moscow Exchange
1991 establishments in Russia
Companies based in Moscow